Belavinskaya is a rural locality (a village) in Yavengskoye Rural Settlement, Vozhegodsky District, Vologda Oblast, Russia. The population was 107 as of 2002.

Geography 
Belavinskaya is located 28 km northeast of Vozhega (the district's administrative centre) by road. Nefedovskaya is the nearest rural locality.

References 

Rural localities in Vozhegodsky District